Kiss and Make Up may refer to:

 Kiss and Make-Up, a 1934 American romantic comedy film starring Cary Grant
 Kiss and Make-up, a book written by Gene Simmons

 "Kiss and Make Up" (Dua Lipa and Blackpink song), 2018
 "Kiss and Make Up", a song by LeVert from the album Bloodline, 1986
 "Kiss and Make Up", a 1974 song by William DeVaughn
 "Kiss and Make Up", a 1990 cover of the 1989 Field Mice song "Let's Kiss and Make Up", by Saint Etienne

See also
 Let's Kiss and Make Up (disambiguation)